Tsarkov (Russian: Царьков) is a family name of Russian origin. 

Notable people with the name include:

 Oleh Tsarkov (born 1988), Ukrainian Olympic sports shooter
 Yevgen Tsarkov (born 1974), Ukrainian politician
 Fyodor Tsarkov (1888–1938), Russian member of the 16th Congress Central Committee
 Pyotr Tsarkaov, Russian member of the Russian Opposition Coordination Council in 2012
 Vladimir Tsarkov (born 1933), Russian commander in the 21st Air Defence Corps who ordered Korean Air Lines Flight 902 shot down
 Yawhen Tsarkov, Belarusian footballer in the 1998 Russian Second Division
 Vasiliy Tsarkov, Russian mixed martial artist competing in the 2010 Fight Nights Global
 Vladimir Tsarkov, Russian circus performer of Valentin Gneushev’s “The Red Harlequin”

See also 
 Tarkovsky (surname) (including a list of people with the name)